Martin Andrew Stanley Ballinger (19 November 1943 – 28 February 2007) was one of the founders of Go-Ahead Group, one of the United Kingdom's largest transport businesses. He lived at Bolam Hall in Northumberland. He died in Newcastle upon Tyne in 2007 and is buried at Bolam.

Career
Born in Peterborough and educated at the Salesian School at Chertsey and Imperial College, London, Martin Ballinger qualified as a management accountant while working at the National Bus Company. He became a General Manager there in 1982. On the privatisation of the National Bus Company in 1987 he founded Go-Ahead Group and, as its first Chief Executive, built it into one of the United Kingdom's largest transport businesses. He retired from Go-Ahead Group in 2004.

In retirement he became Chairman of the Newcastle upon Tyne Hospitals NHS Trust and Chairman of Northgate.

Family
In 1968 he married Diana Susan Edgoose and together they went on to have a daughter, and then a son.

References

1943 births
2007 deaths
Alumni of Imperial College London
People from Peterborough
People in bus transport
British company founders